Down the Wyoming Trail is a 1939 American Western film directed by Albert Herman (as Al Herman) and starring Tex Ritter.

Plot

Cast
 Tex Ritter as Tex Yancey
 White Flash as Tex's Horse
 Horace Murphy as Sheriff Missouri
 Mary Brodel as Candy Parker
 Bobby Larson as Jerry Parker
 Charles King as George Red Becker
 Bob Terry as Blackie
 Jack Ingram as Henchman Monte
 Earl Douglas as Henchman Silent Smith
 Frank LaRue as McClellan
 Ernie Adams as Limpy Watkins
 Charles Sargent as Ted Kern 
 Edward Coxen as Whiskers (as Ed Coxen)
 Jean Sothern as Waitress Hilda
 The Northwesterners as Musicians
 Merle Scobee as Northwesterners Band Member
 A.J. Brier as Northwesterners Band Member
 Wilson F. Rasch as Northwesterners Band Member
 Ray Scobee as Northwesterners Band Member
 Charles L. Davis as Northwesterners Band Member

Soundtrack
 Tex Ritter – "It Makes No Difference Now" (Written by Jimmie Davis and Floyd Tillman)
 Tex Ritter – "In Elk Valley" (Written by Johnny Lange and Lew Porter)
 Tex Ritter – "Goin' Back to Texas" (Written by Carson Robison)
 "Silent Night"
 "Oh, Little Town of Bethlehem"
 "He Looks so Peaceful Now"

References

External links 
 
 

1939 films
1939 Western (genre) films
American Western (genre) films
American black-and-white films
Films directed by Albert Herman
Monogram Pictures films
1930s English-language films
1930s American films